Dr. Thomas D. Wilson has been an active contributor to the world of information science since 1961, when he received his Fellowship from the British Library Association. His research has focused on information management and information seeking behaviour.

Biography
Thomas Daniel Wilson was born in 1935 at Shincliffe Station in  County Durham, England. He left school at age 16 to work as a library assistant in Durham County Library. Following national service in the Royal Air Force  he returned to Durham County Library and took the examinations of the Library Association to qualify as a professional librarian. He then moved to being head of a small academic library - head by default, because he was the only librarian. He then worked as a corporate librarian for the Nuclear Research Centre of C. A. Parsons, at which time he became interested in the use of new technology in information science, but was unable to persuade the computer manager that computer indexing of information was feasible. After completing his Fellowship of the Library Association he began his academic career in 1961. He subsequently obtained a BSc degree in economics and sociology, and a doctorate in organization theory. He is now retired, but still holds several academic positions, including Professor Emeritus at the Department of Information Studies, University of Sheffield, Visiting Professor at Leeds University Business School, Visiting Professor at the University of Boras, Sweden, and Professor Catedratico Convidado in the Faculty of Engineering, University of Oporto. Dr. Wilson received an honorary doctorate from Gothenburg University in 2005 and a second honorary doctorate from the University of Murcia, Spain, in 2010.

Research History

In the area of information behaviour (a term he invented to cover all activities associated with seeking, acquiring, using and sharing information) Dr. Wilson has focused largely in analyzing how individuals and groups gather and communicate information.

INISS Project

Dr. Wilson's best-known study on information seeking behaviour was the INISS project, conducted from 1980 to 1985. The aim of the project was to increase the efficiency of Social Services workers in the management of information. In addition to the traditional methods of surveys and interviews with those seeking the information, Dr. Wilson and his team also observed social workers and their managers in their day-to-day tasks, to see what techniques were actually used to find, use and communicate information. He observed that, in the environment of a Social Services office, the majority of information (60%) was oral, with a further 10% being notes taken on oral communication. That, combined with lack of training in using the other information sources available, had led to a lack of organized information being used at Social Services offices. He recommended the establishment of a central library for Social Services information, along with training staff to access that information, as well as more communication within each office on information needs.

Uncertainty in Information Seeking

More recently, Dr. Wilson looked at information seeking behaviour for the British Library Research and Innovation Centre. The resulting paper, "Uncertainty in Information Seeking," identified that information seeking is based on a series of uncertainty resolutions which lead to a problem solution. There are four steps in the process, problem identification, problem definition, problem resolution, and solution statement. At each step of the process, more information must be gathered in order to resolve the uncertainty of that step. Also, the research established that by providing information seekers with a pattern to follow (such as the four step uncertainty resolution pattern), the accuracy and volume of information they acquired was increased.

Activity theory

Recently, Dr. Wilson has been an advocate for the adoption of activity theory in the area of information behaviour and in information systems research.

Information management

Throughout his research career, Dr. Wilson has also been active in the field of information management and was the founder and first editor of the International Journal of Information Management.  His research in this area included early studies on business use of the World Wide Web, the relationship of information systems and business performance and the application of mobile information systems in policing.

InformationR.net

In addition to this work, Dr. Wilson also founded Information Research, an online journal for information science. This is a freely available, Open Access journal, which constitutes an excellent resource for IS students. The journal is part of the wider InformationR.net site, which also hosts the World list of schools and departments of information science, information management and related disciplines, which he has maintained since 1996.

Current activities

Dr. Wilson's research into information seeking behaviour has been used by instructors in teaching research methods. Though now retired, he continues to engage in research projects through his participation in the AIMTech Research Group at the University of Leeds Business School and through projects at the Swedish School of Library and Information Science. He is a member of the group at the Swedish School which is participating in the SHAMAN project on long-term digital preservation, funded by the European Union. In 2012, together with colleagues at the University of Borås and Gothenburg University, he was awarded a grant of 11.8 million Swedish kronor ($1.7 million) by Vetenskapsrådet (Swedish Research Council) for a programme of research into the production, distribution and use of e-books in Sweden.

Awards

In 2000 Dr. Wilson was the recipient of the ASIS&T SIG USE award for "outstanding contributions to information behavior" and in 2008 was designated "Bobcat of the year" for "outstanding contributions in promoting European library and information science" by EUCLID, the European Association for Library and Information Education and Research.

See also
Wilson's model of information behavior - a model by Wilson about information behavior.

References

External links
 Wilson's Webpage @ InformationR.net (archived)

1935 births
Living people
Academics of the University of Sheffield